Israel Davidson (1870, Jonava, Lithuania⁣ – 1939, Great Neck, New York) was an American writer and publisher of Lithuanian Jewish heritage. He has been recognized as one of the leading American Hebrew writers in his era. His magnum opus was the four volume Otsar ha-shirah veha-piyut = Thesaurus of Mediaeval Hebrew Poetry (NY, 1924–1933).

Davidson studied in yeshivas in Jonava, Volozhin, and Slobodka. In 1898, he immigrated to New York, worked at a few occupations before earning a Ph.D from Columbia University.

References
Goldman, Yosef. Hebrew Printing in America, 1735-1926, A History and Annotated Bibliography (YGBooks 2006). .

External links
 

1870 births
1939 deaths
Columbia University Vagelos College of Physicians and Surgeons alumni
Emigrants from the Russian Empire to the United States
Lithuanian Jews
American people of Lithuanian-Jewish descent
American male writers
American publishers (people)
People from Jonava